Myristica frugifera is a species of plant in the family Myristicaceae. It is endemic to the Philippines.

References

Flora of the Philippines
frugifera
Vulnerable plants
Taxonomy articles created by Polbot